Agricola (fl. 466 – 485) was an Arvernian noble and son of the Western Roman Emperor Avitus.

Biography 
Agricola was the son of Avitus, and therefore the brother of Ecdicius and Papianilla. His grandfather was probably the Agricola who was consul in 421. Agricola was related to the poet Sidonius Apollinaris, who married Papianilla, and to Ruricius of Limoges, who was his father-in-law. He married and had a son, Parthenius, who gave him some grandsons. Two letters are addressed to him by Sidonius Apollinaris (Epistles I.2, 453/466; II.12, before 469), and one by Ruricius (II.32, 485/506).

He was a vir inlustris. When he received Ruricius' letter, he had recently been ordained a priest.

Bibliography 
 Jones, A.H.M., J.R. Martindale, and J. Morris, "Agricola 2", Prosopography of the Later Roman Empire, Volume 2  395–527, Cambridge, 1971–1992, p. 37.

5th-century Romans
5th-century Christian clergy
Correspondents of Sidonius Apollinaris
Sons of Roman emperors